The Scottish records in athletics are ratified by Scottish Athletics, Scotland's governing body for the sport of athletics. At senior level records set by an athlete eligible to represent Scotland are recognised as National Records.

Outdoor
Key to tables:

+ = en route to a longer distance

Men

Women

Indoor

Men

Women

Mixed

Notes

References
General
Scottish records – Outdoor 2 September 2022 updated
Scottish Best Performances – Outdoor 2 October 2022 updated
Scottish records – Indoor 2 May 2022 updated
Specific

External links
Scottish Athletics official website

Scotland
Records
Athletics records
Athletics